The 2002 Eastern Mediterranean Event was a high-energy upper atmosphere explosion over the Mediterranean Sea, around 34°N 21°E (between Libya and Crete) on June 6, 2002. This explosion, similar in power to a small atomic bomb, has been related to a small asteroid undetected while approaching Earth. The object disintegrated as a meteor air burst over the sea, and no meteorite fragments were recovered.

The event occurred during the 2001–2002 India–Pakistan standoff, and there were concerns by General Simon Worden of the U.S. Air Force that if the upper atmosphere explosion had occurred closer to Pakistan or India, it could have sparked a nuclear war between the two countries.

See also 
 Impact event
 Near-Earth object
 Potentially hazardous asteroid
 Vela incident

References 

Explosions in 2002
2002 natural disasters
Modern Earth impact events
Eastern Mediterranean
History of the Mediterranean
June 2002 events in Africa